Dawn Jeannine Wright (born April 15, 1961) is an American geographer and oceanographer. She is a leading authority in the application of geographic information system (GIS) technology to the field of ocean and coastal science, and played a key role in creating the first GIS data model for the oceans. Wright is Chief Scientist of the Environmental Systems Research Institute (aka Esri). She has also been a professor of geography and oceanography at Oregon State University since 1995 and is a former Oregon Professor of the Year as named by the Council for the Advancement and Support of Education and the Carnegie Foundation for the Advancement of Teaching. Wright was the first African-American female to dive to the ocean floor in the deep submersible ALVIN. On July 12, 2022 she became the first Black person to dive to Challenger Deep, the deepest point on Earth, and to successfully operate a sidescan sonar at full-ocean depth.

Education
Wright earned a Bachelor of Science cum laude in geology from Wheaton College in 1983, a Master of Science in oceanography from Texas A&M University in 1986, and an Individual Interdisciplinary Ph.D. in Physical Geography and Marine Geology from University of California, Santa Barbara in 1994. In 2007 she received a Distinguished Alumna Award from UCSB and was also a UCSB College of Letters and Science commencement speaker.

Career
Wright's research interests are mapping of seafloor spreading zones and coral reefs, spatial analysis and geographic information systems as applied to the marine environment. She co-edited one of the first books on marine GIS and is widely known as one of the most influential researchers in this area. Another influential work was a 1997 article widely cited for its analysis of the perception of GIS among geographers in the early 1990s.

Wright began her career as a seagoing marine technician for the Ocean Drilling Program, sailing on ten 2-month expeditions from 1986 to 1989 aboard the JOIDES Resolution, mostly throughout the Indian and Pacific Oceans. Her most prominent service has included the National Academy of Sciences Ocean Studies Board, the Science Advisory Board of NOAA, the Science Advisory Board of the EPA, the National Council of the American Association of Geographers, and Research Chair and Board Member of the University Consortium for Geographic Information Science. A strong advocate of STEM as well as  science communication, she has been profiled by outlets such as Women Oceanographers.org, The Oceanography Society, The Atlantic, NOAA's Sea Grant Program, NOAA's National Marine Sanctuaries Program, Science magazine, Harvard Design magazine, Environment, Coastal & Offshore (ECO) magazine, The HistoryMakers, Let Science Speak, COMPASS Blogs, Ensia, Nature News, BBC radio and a host of student projects (e.g.,).

Wright is member of a number of Editorial boards including GigaScience, Geography Compass, Journal of Coastal Conservation, The Anthropocene Review, Annals of the American Association of Geographers, International Journal of Geographical Information Science, Marine Geodesy, and Transactions in GIS.

In 2018, Wright appeared in the Tribeca Film Festival in the short film series "Let Science Speak."

Awards and honors
Wright is an elected member of the National Academy of Sciences and the American Academy of Arts and Sciences, a fellow of the American Association for the Advancement of Science and of the Aldo Leopold Leadership Program. Other honors include:
 Fellow, The Oceanography Society, 2020
Geosciences Innovator Award, Texas A&M University College of Geosciences, 2019
Fellow of the California Academy of Sciences, 2018
 Steinbach Visiting Scholar (At-Large), MIT/WHOI Joint Program in Oceanography/Applied Ocean Science & Engineering, 2018
 18th Roger Revelle Commemorative Lecturer, National Academy of Sciences Ocean Studies Board, 2017
 Fellow of the Geological Society of America, 2016
 Randolph W. “Bill” and Cecile T. Bromery Award for Minorities, Geological Society of America, 2015
 Leptoukh Lecture Award, Earth and Space Science Informatics Focus Group, American Geophysical Union (AGU), 2015
 Distinguished Teaching Honors, Association of American Geographers (now the American Association of Geographers), 2013
 Presidential Achievement Award, Association of American Geographers (now the American Association of Geographers), 2012
 Milton Harris Award for Excellence in Basic Research, OSU College of Science, 2005
 NSF CAREER Award, 1995

Selected publications
Wright has authored nearly 100 peer-reviewed journal articles and 12 books. A selection is listed here.

Diversity and inclusion 
Wright is a member of the American Geophysical Union's Diversity and Inclusion Advisory Committee. She is also a supporter and participant in the Black in Marine Science organization.

See also
 List of people who descended to Challenger Deep

References

External links
 Dawn Wright's homepage
 Esri and the Science Community
 Dawn Wright Wakelet
 Dawn Wright Oral History Interview
 Let Science Speak - Dr. Dawn Wright

20th-century African-American scientists
20th-century African-American women
20th-century American geologists
20th-century American women scientists
21st-century American geologists
21st-century American scientists
21st-century American women scientists
21st-century African-American scientists
21st-century African-American women
1961 births
African-American women scientists
American geographers
American oceanographers
American women geologists
Living people
Fellows of the American Association for the Advancement of Science
Members of the United States National Academy of Sciences
Texas A&M University alumni
University of California, Santa Barbara alumni
Wheaton College (Illinois) alumni
Women oceanographers